José Antonio Martínez Cervera (born 10 June 1983), known simply as José, is a Spanish professional footballer who plays as a right-back.

Club career
Born in Barcelona, Catalonia, José spent most of his career with Girona FC in his native region, representing the club in the second, third and fourth divisions of Spanish football. He appeared in 38 games in the 2012–13 season (including four in the playoffs), helping the team to the fourth position in the second tier and scoring his first goal as a professional on 31 March 2013 in a 2–1 away loss against CD Numancia.

In the summer of 2013, 30-year-old José moved abroad for the first time, signing with Cyprus's AC Omonia. He returned to his homeland at the end of one sole campaign in the First Division, going on to compete in the lower leagues until his retirement.

On 26 August 2017, in the second round of the third-tier season, José featured the entire 0–2 home defeat to CE Sabadell FC as a UE Olot player, with his brother Ángel coming on as a second-half substitute for the opposition. He resumed his career in the Catalan regional divisions after leaving in December 2019, with Palamós CF.

Personal life
José's younger brother, Ángel, was also a footballer. Both shared teams in the 2010–11 season.

References

External links

1983 births
Living people
Spanish footballers
Footballers from Barcelona
Association football defenders
Segunda División players
Segunda División B players
Tercera División players
Divisiones Regionales de Fútbol players
CF Damm players
CF Peralada players
Girona FC players
Real Murcia players
UE Olot players
Palamós CF footballers
Cypriot First Division players
AC Omonia players
Spanish expatriate footballers
Expatriate footballers in Cyprus
Spanish expatriate sportspeople in Cyprus